Tethyopsis is a genus of sponges belonging to the family Ancorinidae.

The species of this genus are found in southern South Hemisphere and Malesia.

Species:

Tethyopsis brondstedi 
Tethyopsis calcifera 
Tethyopsis columnifera 
Tethyopsis dubia 
Tethyopsis longispinus 
Tethyopsis mortenseni 
Tethyopsis patriciae 
Tethyopsis plurima 
Tethyopsis radiata

References

Sponges